CCHA may refer to:

Central Collegiate Hockey Association
Community College Humanities Association
City Champions for Heat Action